Summer McIntosh (born 18 August 2006) is a Canadian competitive swimmer. McIntosh first drew recognition when, at age 14, she was the youngest member of the Canadian team for the 2020 Summer Olympics, where she achieved a notable fourth-place finish in the 400 metre freestyle. The following year she became the youngest world champion in swimming in over a decade, and the first Canadian to win two gold medals at a single World Championships, for which she was dubbed a "teen swimming sensation."

Personal life
McIntosh is the daughter of Greg McIntosh and former Canadian Olympic team swimmer Jill Horstead. Her older sister Brooke is a competitive pair skater.

Career
McIntosh has broken over 50 age group national swimming records. In May 2021, McIntosh swam a 4:05.13 in the 400 metre freestyle, the fastest time ever by a 14-year-old swimmer worldwide.

2021 season 
As part of the 2021 Canadian Olympic swimming trials in Toronto, McIntosh won the 200 metre freestyle event over training partner Penny Oleksiak, with a personal best time of 1:56.19, which also marked the fastest time ever by a 14 year old swimmer worldwide. This qualified her for the 2020 Summer Olympics in Tokyo. McIntosh followed this up with a win in the 800 metre freestyle event, in another personal best time of 8:29.49. She was the youngest person named to the Canadian Olympic team.

In her first event, McIntosh finished fourth in the 400 metre freestyle, breaking the Canadian national record with a time of 4:02.42. She advanced to the semifinals of the women's 200m freestyle, but placed ninth there and thus missed the final. She was part of the Canadian team for the 4×200 metre relay, along with Oleksiak, Rebecca Smith and Kayla Sanchez. They set a new Canadian record in the event final, placing fourth. McIntosh's last event was the 800 metre freestyle, where she placed eleventh and thus did not advance to the final.

Following the Olympics, McIntosh made her debut on the International Swimming League as part of the Toronto Titans.

McIntosh was part of the Canadian team for the 2021 World Short Course Championships, and won a silver medal as part of the 4×100 metre medley relay, where she swam in the preliminaries for Canada as the team finished in second in the final. She then helped the Canadian team in the 4×200 metre freestyle relay, swimming the first leg as Canada won gold. McIntosh won her first individual medal of the competition when she won the silver in the 400 metre freestyle race. She was third at the halfway mark but passed Siobhan Haughey and held on to the second position, finishing behind Li Bingjie. McIntosh had set a Canadian record in the 800 metre qualifying, but she withdrew from the event to focus on the 400 and women's relay events.

2022 season 
On 4 March, 2022, McIntosh swam the 400 metre individual medley at a preparatory event for the Canadian swimming trials, recording a time of 4:29.12. This was both a national and Commonwealth record, and the third-fastest of all-time, as well as the fastest time recorded by any swimmer since Katinka Hosszú's winning time at the 2016 Summer Olympics. At the national swimming trials, McIntosh won titles in the 200 metre and 400 metre freestyle, the 200 metre butterly, and the 400 metre individual medley, before scratching from the 800 metre freestyle.

McIntosh made her senior FINA World Aquatics Championships debut at the 2022 edition in Budapest, Hungary, with her first event being the 400 metre freestyle. She finished second in the final, taking the silver medal with a new personal best and national record time of 3:59.39. She was only the fourth woman in history to record a time of under four minutes. McIntosh set another world junior record in the semi-final of the 200 metre butterfly with a 2:05.79 time, exceeding her own as-yet-unratified record from the Canadian swimming trials. She broke the record again the following day, 22 June, in the event final, claiming her first World title, the first medal of any colour for Canada in the event. She was the first 15-year-old to win a World title since China's Ye Shiwen in 2011, and the youngest Canadian world champion in history, surpassing 18-year-old Victor Davis in 1982. Later in that same session she participated in the event final of the 4×200 metre freestyle relay, breaking another junior world record with a 1:54.79 opening leg, the second-fastest of any woman in the event behind Katie Ledecky of the United States. The Canadian team won the bronze medal. In her final event, the 400 metre individual medley, McIntosh won her second gold medal of the championships, beating American Katie Grimes by 0.63 seconds. She became the first Canadian swimmer to win two gold medals at a single World Championships, and set a new record for the most medals won by a Canadian at a single World Championships (4), which would be tied later that same day by Penny Oleksiak and Kayla Sanchez. As well, she was the youngest winner since Tracy Caulkins in 1978. McIntosh called the results "a dream come true," and praised Grimes, noting "she is around my age and she's a really tough competitor. So I'm looking forward to racing her and keep pushing myself."

A month later, McIntosh was part of her first Commonwealth Games team, for the 2022 edition in Birmingham, England. She opted not to contest the 200 metre butterfly there, citing the need to focus on other events. Heavily favoured in the 400 m medley, she won gold on the first day of the competition schedule, improving her world junior, Commonwealth, and national records to 4:29.01. She finished 7.77 seconds ahead of silver medalist Kiah Melverton, and was the first Canadian gold medalist of the Games. McIntosh was then given the novel opportunity to participate in Canada's 4×100 metre freestyle relay team, with mainstay members like Oleksiak, Sanchez and Taylor Ruck absent, winning a bronze medal. She noted that she "didn't really know what to expect, the 100 free is not my main event so I just tried to put a good time down to set it up for the rest of the girls." The next day she took her more customary place on the 4×200 metre freestyle relay team, swimming the leadoff leg and helping take the silver medal. Of this, she said she was "very proud." On the fourth day, she competed in the 200 metre individual medley, a much more uncommon event for her than the 400 metre individual medley. McIntosh won the gold medal, defeating reigning World silver medalist Kaylee McKeown of Australia and setting a new world junior record. McIntosh noted that "the 200 IM is more of a sprinting event for me," adding "the only pressure I feel is what I put on myself. The only thing that matters is my expectations." With the result, McIntosh recorded one of the top four results of 2022 in five different events. On the final day of the swimming competitions, McIntosh won two more silver medals, finishing behind Ariarne Titmus in the 400 metre freestyle while lowering her own national record and then swimming the freestyle leg of the 4×100 metre medley relay, typically performed for the Canadian team by the absent Oleksiak.

Following the conclusion of the Commonwealth Games, Swimming World magazine, assessing her "vast talent on display at two championship-level events," opined "it's not hype and bluster anymore. Based purely on results from this year, not career medal totals or performance over a long stretch of time, McIntosh is the third-best female swimmer in the world."

On 28 October, at the 2022 FINA Swimming World Cup in Toronto, and conducted in short course metres, McIntosh set a new world junior record, World Cup record, Americas record, and Canadian record in the 400 metre freestyle on day one, finishing in a time of 3:52.80 in the final to win the gold medal. The following day, she won the gold medal in the 400 metre individual medley with a world junior record and Canadian record time of 4:21.49. She and fellow Canadians Sydney Pickrem and Bailey Andison won all the medals in the event. Approximately 50 minutes later, she placed eighth in the 100 metre backstroke with a time of 58.84 seconds. The following, and final, day, she won a pair of bronze medals, the first in the 200 metre backstroke with a personal best time of 2:02.85 and the second in the 200 metre individual medley with a personal best time of 2:06.57.

The next, and final, stop of the World Cup circuit, McIntosh won the gold medal in the 200 metre butterfly on 3 November, finishing in a personal best time of 2:03.40, which was the only time in the final faster than 2:04.00. Day two, she finished in a personal best time of 1:52.63 in the 200 metre freestyle final to place fifth. On the third and final day, she dropped 6.25 seconds from her personal best time in the 800 metre freestyle to win the silver medal with a Canadian record time of 8:07.12.

The following month, at the 2022 U.S. Open Swimming Championships, McIntosh won the gold medal in the 400 metre individual medley with a Championships record, world junior record, and US Open record time of 4:28.61. The following day, she won the silver medal in the 200 metre backstroke with a personal best time of 2:07.15, which was 1.87 seconds behind gold medalist Regan Smith of the United States. Earlier in the meet, on day two, she won the silver medal in the 400 metre freestyle.

Results

Championships

 McIntosh withdrew from the 800 freestyle after swimming in the heats.

Swimming World Cup
The following medals McIntosh has won at Swimming World Cup circuits.

Personal bests

Long course (50-metre pool)

Short course (25-metre pool)

References
54.   Summer McIntosh Sets U.S. Open,                         World Junior Records with 2:05.05 in 200    Fly win. Swimswam. Retrieved 2 March 2023.

External links
 
 
 
 
 SummerMcIntosh.com

2006 births
Living people
Swimmers from Toronto
Canadian female freestyle swimmers
Swimmers at the 2020 Summer Olympics
Medalists at the FINA World Swimming Championships (25 m)
World Aquatics Championships medalists in swimming
Olympic swimmers of Canada
Commonwealth Games gold medallists for Canada
Commonwealth Games silver medallists for Canada
Commonwealth Games bronze medallists for Canada
Commonwealth Games medallists in swimming
Swimmers at the 2022 Commonwealth Games
Medallists at the 2022 Commonwealth Games